Mönkhkhaan (Eternal Khan) is a sum (district) of Sükhbaatar Province in eastern Mongolia. The Bürentsogt Tungsten Mine is 41 km SW from the sum center. In 2009, its population was 4,213.

References 

Districts of Sükhbaatar Province